Bulletproof is the third studio album by American rapper Hush from Detroit, Michigan. It was released on August 23, 2005, via Geffen Records. The album features guest appearances from Eminem, Kuniva, Bizarre and Swifty McVay from D12, Bareda and Lo-Down from Raw Collection, and guitarist Phil Campbell. The album debuted at number 83 on the Top R&B/Hip-Hop Albums and number 39 on the Heatseekers Albums in the United States.

The album contains some of the songs from The Contender (TV series). A clean version of "Fired Up" is used in the 2005 video game Need for Speed: Most Wanted. The song "The March" was featured on ×X×: State of the Union (Music from the Motion Picture).

Track listing 

Notes
 signifies an additional producer.
 signifies a co-producer.

Personnel 

 Alicia N. Graham – A&R administrator
 Anthony Kilhoffer – assistant recording (track 4)
 Atan Ayoub – guitar (track 3)
 Beau Dozier – producer (track 6)
 Daniel Carlisle – main artist, producer (tracks: 7–8, 11), additional production (track 12), drum programming (tracks: 7–8), keyboards (track 7)
 Dave Press – drums (tracks: 8, 12)
 Dave "Supa Star" Dar – additional recording (track 4)
 Devon Dowdell – featured artist (track 12)
 Elliot Blakey – assistant recording (track 4)
 Evan Peters – A&R coordinator
 Greg Calbi – mastering 
 Jermaine Harbin – additional vocals (track 5)
 Jordan Schur – executive producer
 Julian Bunetta – producer, recording & mixing (tracks: 1–2, 4–6, 9, 11)
 Kai Regan – photography
 Kaya Jones – background vocals (track 4)
 Luis Resto – additional production & keyboards (tracks: 3, 10)
 Marshall Mathers – guest artist (track 10), producer & mixing (tracks: 3, 10)
 Mike Strange – recording (tracks: 3, 10)
 Nathaniel Dwayne Hale – featured artist (track 3)
 Neal Ferrazzani – additional recording (track 3)
 Ondre Moore – featured artist (track 10)
 Phil Campbell – additional guitar (track 12)
 Randy Lynch – co-producer & bass (tracks: 7–8), guitar (tracks: 7–8, 12)
 Rufus Johnson – featured artist (track 6)
 Salim Grant – background vocals (track 9)
 Scott Sumner – co-producer & keyboards (tracks: 7–8), recording
 Steve King – bass & mixing (tracks: 3, 10), guitar (track 10)
 Talib Kweli Greene – featured artist (track 4)
 Thom Panunzio – A&R, mixing (tracks: 7–8, 12), additional production & recording (track 12)
 Tony Compana – recording (tracks: 3, 10)
 Von Carlisle – featured artist (track 10)
 Lo-Down – featured artist (track 12)
 Notes – producer (track 12)

Charts

References

External links

2005 albums
Hush (rapper) albums
Geffen Records albums
Albums produced by Eminem
Rap rock albums by American artists